The Eastern Ontario Senior Hockey League, or EOSHL, is a top Senior ice hockey league in Eastern Ontario that operated from 2003 to 2008, merged into the Major Hockey League in 2008 and resumed its operations from 2019 onwards.  The EOSHL is governed by the Ontario Hockey Association.

History
The EOSHL became a sanctioned Senior "A" league in 2003.  In 2005, the league was promoted to Senior "AAA" to compete against the Major League Hockey (MLH) league and have a chance to win the Allan Cup.  In 2006, the league dropped from six to four teams.

During the 2007-08 season, a new team known as the Cooks Bay Canucks joined the league.  What ensued with this franchise his quite original, as the team, although successful on the ice, underwent two name changes in the same season.  The team started the season as the Cooks Bay Canucks, but soon dropped it for the Simcoe County Canucks.  Although that does not sound too strange, the Canucks made the playoffs and before game two of the league semi-final announced another name change to the Simcoe County Tundras, with new logos, and completely different jerseys and team colours.

The Eastern Ontario Senior Hockey League merged with Major League Hockey in 2008, when AAA-level senior hockey in the OHA shrunk to only five teams.

The EOSHL is back in action after an 11 year break. It will resume for the 2019/2020 season with 4 teams. Cornwall Senior Prowlers, West Carleton Rivermen, Maxville Millionaires and Deseronto Bulldogs with hopes of adding teams for the 2020/2021 season. Each team will play a total of 18 regular season games. 6 games versus each opponents with 3 home and 3 away games against each team.

Teams

Champions
2008 Whitby Dunlops
2007 Whitby Dunlops
2006 Whitby Dunlops
2005 Norwood Vipers
2004 Belleville Macs

Bolded teams were the winners of the Robertson Cup as Ontario Hockey Association champions.

References

External links
Eastern Ontario Senior League Website
OHA Website

Defunct ice hockey leagues in Ontario